Rybinsky District  is an administrative and municipal district (raion), one of the seventeen in Yaroslavl Oblast, Russia. It is located in the northwest of the oblast. Its administrative center is the city of Rybinsk (which is not administratively a part of the district). Population: 28,153 (2010 Census); 
Pavel Batov was born in Filisovo, a village in the district.

Administrative and municipal status
Within the framework of administrative divisions, Rybinsky District is one of the seventeen in the oblast. The city of Rybinsk serves as its administrative center, despite being incorporated separately as a city of oblast significance—an administrative unit with the status equal to that of the districts.

As a municipal division, the district is incorporated as Rybinsky Municipal District. The city of oblast significance of Rybinsk is incorporated separately from the district as Rybinsk Urban Okrug.

References

Notes

Sources



Districts of Yaroslavl Oblast